Upāsakadaśāh is the seventh of the 12 Jain āgamas said to be promulgated by Māhavīra himself. Upāsakadaśāh  translated as "Ten Chapters on Lay Attenders" is said to have been composed by Ganadhara Sudharmaswami as per the Śvetámbara tradition.

Subject matter
It contains stories describing the piety of the advanced laymen and their fortitude in face of demonic attacks.

English translations
Popular English Translations are  :-
Illustrated SRI UPASAKADASA SUTRA Prakrit Gatha - Hindi exposition - English exposition and Appendices Ed. by Pravartaka Amar Muni, Shrichand Surana, Eng. tr. by Surendra Bothra

Agamas
Jain texts